MSC Cyberport Johor is a public-private partnership spearheaded by the State Government of Johor, Malaysia to create a Global Information and Communication Technology (ICT) Business Hub for ICT companies from around the world within the Iskandar Malaysia. It is part with the MSC Malaysia initiative of the Government of Malaysia.

See also
 List of technology centers
 Multimedia Super Corridor

Notes and references

External links
 MSC Malaysia
 Iskandar Malaysia
 http://www.mdv.com.my/cms/content.jsp?id=com.tms.cms.article.Article_913d9d9e-a9fef549-4d93e300-fa8a1655
 https://web.archive.org/web/20110718004746/http://www.mscmalaysia.my/main_art.php?parentID=12073056649982&artID=12082571684963&CategoryID=3&p_artID=513

Johor Bahru
High-technology business districts in Malaysia
Information technology places
MSC Malaysia
Science and technology in Malaysia
2006 establishments in Malaysia